Keiichi Hirano (平野 恵一, born April 7, 1979) is a Japanese former professional baseball infielder. He played in Nippon Professional Baseball (NPB) for the Orix Buffaloes and Hanshin Tigers from 2002 to 2015.

Career
Hirano played 14 seasons in Nippon Professional Baseball (NPB) for the Orix Buffaloes (2002-2007, 2013-2015) and the Hanshin Tigers (2008-2012). In his career, Hirano batted .279/.337/.341 with 18 home runs and 263 RBI in 1,260 total games. He was also a 4-time NPB All-Star (2005, 2010-2012), 2-time Mitsui Golden Glove Award winner (2010-2011), 2-time Best Nine Award winner (2010-2011) and 1-time Comeback Player of the Year (2008).

Hirano served as a coach for his former club, the Hanshin Tigers, from 2016 to 2021. On January 10, 2022, Hirano was hired by the CTBC Brothers of the Chinese Professional Baseball League (CPBL) to serve as the team's hitting coach and infield coordinator.

References

External links

1979 births
Living people
Asian Games bronze medalists for Japan
Asian Games medalists in baseball
Baseball players at the 2002 Asian Games
Hanshin Tigers players
Japanese baseball coaches
Japanese baseball players
Medalists at the 2002 Asian Games
Nippon Professional Baseball coaches
Nippon Professional Baseball outfielders
Nippon Professional Baseball second basemen
Orix BlueWave players
Orix Buffaloes players
Baseball people from Kanagawa Prefecture